Comme une symphonie d'amour is a 1979 album by South African singer Miriam Makeba. The album has been published in several editions, including one by Gallo Records in 2006. Some editions are entitled Malaisha.

Track listing
 "Comme une symphonie d'amour" (Jérôme Camilly, Pierre Jeantet) – 3:45
 "Malaisha (Bring the Axe)" (Rajkama) – 3:40
 "Iyaguduza" (Miriam Makeba) – 5:38
 "Chicken (Kikirikiki)" (Pai) – 4:22
 "Ndibanga Hamba" (Miriam Makeba) – 3:25
 "Sabelani" (Philemon Hou) – 4:46
 "Ngewundini" (Miriam Makeba) – 4:32
 "African Convention" (Hugh Masekela) – 5:05
 "Murtala" (Bongi Makeba) – 6:20

Personnel
Miriam Makeba – vocals
Achille Ango, Jules Kamga, Krishna Yarbrough – guitar
Jean-Yves Messan, Kim Yarbrough – bass
Wally Badarou – piano
Denis Hekimian, Nanou – drums
Mam Houari, Patrick Bourgoin – saxophone
Hugh Masekela – trumpet
Hugh Masekela, Miriam Makeba, Philemon Hou – chorus

References

External links

1979 albums
Miriam Makeba albums